René Silva (27 November 1954 – 3 June 1978) was a Nicaraguan boxer. He competed in the men's bantamweight event at the 1972 Summer Olympics. At the 1972 Summer Olympics, he lost to Ferry Moniaga of Indonesia.

References

1954 births
1978 deaths
Nicaraguan male boxers
Olympic boxers of Nicaragua
Boxers at the 1972 Summer Olympics
Sportspeople from León, Nicaragua
Bantamweight boxers